Rogério Dutra da Silva won the first edition of the tournament 4–6, 6–3, 6–1 in the final against Jozef Kovalík.

Seeds

Draw

Finals

Top half

Bottom half

References
 Main Draw
 Qualifying Draw

Taroii Open de Tenis - Singles
2013 Singles